Jukebox the Ghost is an American three-piece power pop band formed in the Washington, D.C. Metro Area. The band consists of Ben Thornewill (vocals & piano), Tommy Siegel (vocals & guitar) and Jesse Kristin (drums). The band has been active since 2003.

Albums

Studio albums

Live albums

Extended plays

Singles

Other appearances

Notes

References

Discographies of American artists
Rock music group discographies